Time and Tide, an album by the Battlefield Band, was released in 2002 on the Temple Records label.

Track listing
 "Chuir I Gluin Air a Bhodach (She Put a Knee in the Old Man)/DJ MacLeod' " – 4:22
 "Nancy's Whiskey" – 4:40
 "If Cadillac Made Tractors.../Happy Birthday Fiona/MacFarlane's Rant" – 3:58
 "Camden Town" – 3:26
 "James Cameron/Fosgail an Doras (Open the Door)/The Skylark's Ascension" – 4:40
 "Time and Tide" – 3:52
 "The Bonny Jeannie Deans" – 4:08
 "The Walking Nightmare/Drive Home the Mainlanders/The Mill House" – 3:17
 "Rothesay Bay" – 3:37
 "Banais Choinnich (Kenneth's Wedding)/Eileen MacDonald/Welcome the Piper" – 2:49
 "Sunset" – 3:51
 "Whiskey From the Field/Volcanic Organic" – 3:57

References

Battlefield Band albums
2002 albums